Gilruthia is a genus of flowering plants in the family Asteraceae.

There is only one known species, Gilruthia osbornii, endemic to Western Australia.

References

Gnaphalieae
Flora of Western Australia
Monotypic Asteraceae genera